The 1922 municipal election was held December 11, 1922 to elect a mayor and six aldermen to sit on Edmonton City Council and three trustees to sit on the public school board.  R Crossland, P M Dunne, Joseph Gariépy, and J J Murray were acclaimed to two-year terms on the separate school board.

There were ten aldermen on city council, but four of the positions were already filled: Ambrose Bury, James East, Thomas Malone, and Charles Weaver were all elected to two-year terms in 1921 and were still in office. Bickerton Pratt had also been elected to a two-year term in 1921, but had resigned in order to run for mayor.  Accordingly, Valentine Richards was elected to a one-year term.

There were seven trustees on the public school board, but four of the positions were already filled: Samuel Barnes, Ralph Bellamy, Frank Scott, and Frank Crang had all been elected to two-year terms in 1921 and were still in office.  The same was true on the separate board, where F A French, Paul Jenvrin, Thomas Magee, and Joseph Henri Picard were continuing.

The six candidates for mayor were a record high to date.

For the aldermanic election, each voter could cast up to six votes (Block Voting.

The 1922 election saw the defeat of the first woman elected to city council. Izena Ross had been elected to a one-year term in 1921, and ran for re-election but finished eighth. She received more votes than she had in 1921 but this time was not elected. It would be 1933 before voters would elect another woman.

This would be the last election for years that would be conducted under the at-large Block Voting system. Voters in this election voted to replace the system with at-large Single Transferable Voting/Proportional representation (STV/PR) system, which had been used in Calgary city elections since 1917.

Voter turnout
Out of 20,403 eligible voters, 10,923 cast ballots, for a voter turnout of 53.5%. The number of eligible votes was recorded as much lower than the previous election. A census held in 1921 measured the precipitous population dip that had occurred in Edmonton during the war years and in the post-WWI recession.

Results

 bold indicates elected
 italics indicate incumbent
 South Side, where data is available, indicates representative for Edmonton's South Side, with a minimum South Side representation instituted after the city of Strathcona, south of the North Saskatchewan River, amalgamated into Edmonton on February 1, 1912.

Mayor

Aldermen
Due to each voter being able to cast up to 6 votes, 53,000 votes were cast in this election by the 11,000 voters who voted. The Plurality block voting system meant that it was possible for the largest group (even if just a minority of the voters) to take all the seats, leaving none to the others.

Public school trustees

W H Alexander - 6146
E T Bishop - 5350
L T Barclay - 4794
C W Leonard - 3955

Separate (Catholic) school trustees

R Crossland, P M Dunne, Joseph Gariépy, and J J Murray (South Side) were acclaimed.

Single Transferable Vote Plebiscite

Shall the Council pass Bylaw No. 42 (1922), being a bylaw for providing for the taking of the votes of the Electors at all future Elections of Mayor and Aldermen of the City of Edmonton by the "Proportional Representation System" known as the "Single Transferable Vote"?
Yes - 5664
No - 3075

References

Election History, City of Edmonton: Elections and Census Office

1922
1922 elections in Canada
1922 in Alberta